Litorivivens is a genus of bacteria from the class Gammaproteobacteria.

References

Gammaproteobacteria
Bacteria genera